ACC most often refers to:
Atlantic Coast Conference, an NCAA Division I collegiate athletic conference located in the US
American College of Cardiology, a US-based nonprofit medical association that bestows credentials upon cardiovascular specialists
Air Combat Command, a major command of the US Air Force headquartered at Langley Air Force Base
Association of Corporate Counsel, a global organization serving attorneys who practice in corporate law departments
American Chemistry Council, an industry trade association for American chemical companies

ACC may also refer to:

Business
 ACC Limited, an Indian cement manufacturer
 ACCBank, an Irish commercial bank
 American Campus Communities, a private student housing provider
 American Chemistry Council, an industry trade association for American chemical companies
  American Credit Corporation, renamed Barclays American
 Asia Cement Corporation, a cement company in Taiwan
 Associated Co-operative Creameries, or one of its successors:
 ACC Milk, part of Dairy Farmers of Britain, and
 Co-operative Retail Logistics, a division of Co-operative Group Ltd
 Association of Corporate Counsel, an organization serving attorneys who practice in the corporate law

Christianity
 Anglican Catholic Church, a body of Anglican Christians not in the Anglican Communion
 Anglican Church of Canada, a church of the Anglican Communion
 Anglican Consultative Council, an international body of the Anglican Communion
 Apostolic Catholic Church, a self-governing church of Catholic Protestants originating in the Philippines
 Apostolic Christian Church, a church of Anabaptist origins
 Australian Christian Channel, a television channel in Australia
 Australian Christian Churches, also known as Assemblies of God in Australia (AOG)

Education
 Accreditation Committee of Cambodia, higher education quality and assessment body in Cambodia
 Accredited Clinical Coder, a vocational qualification awarded to UK clinical coders
   Adamjee Cantonment College, an institution in Bangladesh.
 Adirondack Community College, now SUNY Adirondack, a two-year college in New York in the US
 Allegany Community College, now Allegany College of Maryland in the US
 Alvin Community College, a community college in Alvin, Texas, in the US
 American College of Cardiology, a non-profit medical organization
 American Craft Council, a non-profit educational organization
 Another Course to College, a pilot school in Boston, Massachusetts, in the US
 Arapahoe Community College, in Littleton, Colorado, in the US
 Army Cadet College, a defence training establishment in India, now in Dehradun
 Asnuntuck Community College, a community college in Enfield, Connecticut, in the US
 Assiniboine Community College, a community college in Brandon, Manitoba, in Canada
 Atlanta Christian College, now Point University, a university near Atlanta, Georgia, in the US
 Austin Community College, a community college in the Austin, Texas, area in the US

Government, military, and politics
 Allied Clandestine Committee, a 1957 founded NATO organisation
 Accident Compensation Corporation, a New Zealand state insurance agency
 Adelaide City Council, former name of the City of Adelaide, a local government area in the metropolitan area of Adelaide, South Australia
 Air Combat Command, a major command of the US Air Force headquartered at Langley Air Force Base
 Air Component Commander, the manager and commander of the Royal Australian Air Force's Force Element Groups
 Allied Control Commission, or Allied Commission, a type of commission consisting of representatives of the major Allied Powers in World War II
 Allied Control Council, a military occupation governing body in Germany after the end of World War II
 Anti Corruption Commission Bangladesh, an independent, semi-governmental commission
 Appointments Committee of the Cabinet, a government committee that decides appointments to several top posts in the Government of India
 Arab Cooperation Council, an Arab economic organization set up as a rival to the Gulf Cooperation Council (GCC)
 Arizona Corporation Commission - a public utility regulator in Arizona
 Army Catering Corps, a corps of the British Army responsible for the feeding of all army units
 Assistant Chief Constable, a British police rank
 Association of Conservative Clubs, an organisation associated with the Conservative Party in the UK
 Australian Crime Commission, former name of one of the components of the Australian Criminal Intelligence Commission
 Asia Culture Center, an arts complex in Gwangju, South Korea.

Language, media, and communication
Achi language, a Mayan language of Guatemala (ISO 639-3 code ACC)
 Accusative case, the grammatical case used to mark the direct object of a transitive verb
 Advent Children Complete, the director's cut of the 2005 film Final Fantasy VII Advent Children
 American Country Countdown, a weekly syndicated radio program 
 Annenberg Center for Communication, a research center at the University of Southern California in the US

Non-government organisations

 American Conservation Coalition, a nonprofit environmental advocacy organisation 
 Americans for Common Cents, a pro-penny lobbying organisation in the US
 Angel City Chorale, a Los Angeles choir
 Anti-Capitalist Convergence, organisations in North America which coordinated activities by the social justice, anarchist and environmentalist anti-capitalists
 Asian Cultural Council, a New York-based foundation promoting cultural exchange between the US and Asia
 The Atlantic Council of Canada, an NGO promoting the North Atlantic Treaty Organization (NATO) in Canada
 Australian Copyright Council, a non-profit organisation dedicated to understanding copyright law

Science, mathematics, and medicine
 Agenesis of the corpus callosum, a rare birth defect in which there is a complete or partial absence of the corpus callosum
 ACC, one of the genetic codons of threonine
 Acetyl-CoA carboxylase, an enzyme that turns acetyl-CoA into malonyl-CoA
 Acetylcysteine, used in the management of paracetamol overdose
 Adenoid cystic carcinoma (also abbreviated AdCC), a rare glandular tumor that primarily appears in the salivary glands
 American College of Cardiology, A US-based nonprofit medical association that bestows credentials upon cardiovascular specialists
 1-Aminocyclopropane-1-carboxylic acid, an intermediate in the biological synthesis of ethylene
 Antarctic Circumpolar Current, an ocean current 
 Anterior cingulate cortex, the frontal part of the cingulate cortex
  Anthropogenic climate change, a.k.a. anthropogenic global warming, climate change caused by humans
 Ascending chain condition, a condition in commutative algebra
 ACC (complexity), a hierarchy of complexity classes used in circuit complexity
 Adrenocortical carcinoma, an aggressive cancer originating in the cortex, also called "adrenal cortical carcinoma" or "adrenal cortex cancer"
 Aortic cross-clamp, a surgical instrument used in cardiac surgery to clamp the aorta

Sports and games
 Aberdeenshire Cricket Club, a cricket club based in Aberdeen, Scotland
 ACC Liverpool, an arena and convention centre in Liverpool
 AFC Challenge Cup, an international football competition for Asian Football Confederation (AFC) member countries
 Air Canada Centre, former name of Scotiabank Arena, an arena in Toronto, Ontario, Canada
 Alpine Club of Canada, Canada's national mountaineering organization
 Amway Canadian Championship, an annual soccer tournament contested by Canadian professional teams
 Asian Club Championship, an association football competition organised by the Asian Football Confederation
 Asian Cricket Council, an organisation whose aim is to promote and develop the game of cricket within Asia
 Asian Cycling Confederation, the confederation of cycling's national governing bodies in Asia
 Assetto Corsa Competizione, the official PC racing simulation of the 2018 Blancpain GT Series
 Associated Catholic Colleges, an Australian Schools Sporting Association
 Atlantic Coast Conference, an NCAA Division I collegiate athletic conference located in the US
 Athletic & Convocation Center, University of Notre Dame facility renamed in 1987 as the Edmund P. Joyce Center
 America's Cup Class, a sailboat class
 Touring and Automobile Club of Colombia

Technology
 ACC (computer company), a Hong Kong-based computer company which manufactured the ACC 8000
 ACC (programming language), a compiler for use under the MS-DOS operating system
   Accumulator, a type of rechargeable battery
 Active clearance control, an engine temperature control
 Active Cylinder Control, a variable displacement technology
 Adaptive cruise control, an advanced automotive cruise control system
 Automatic climate control, a type of automobile air conditioning
 Autonomous Cruise Control, a car cruise control system also known as adaptive cruise control
   Advanced clock calibration, a technology in the AMD 700 chipset series that enables higher CPU clock speeds
 Remington Accelerator (ACC), a Remington .224 caliber bullet inside a .30 caliber sabot
 ACC wire, red wire that only supplies power, mainly to accessories, when the car is ignited, see connectors for car audio

Transportation
 Acton Central railway station, on the North London Line (station code ACC)
 Kotoka International Airport, Accra, Ghana (IATA airport code ACC)
 Area control center, a type of air traffic control facility
 Touring & Automovil Club de Colombia, a motoring club and member of the Fédération Internationale de l'Automobile in South America